The National Background Investigations Bureau (NBIB) was a semi-autonomous U.S. Government agency that was housed within the United States Office of Personnel Management. In September 2019, background investigations were transferred from OPM's NBIB to  Defense Counterintelligence and Security Agency.

See also
USIS
Edward Snowden
Blake Percival

References

External links 
 

United States Department of Defense agencies
2016 establishments in the United States
United States Office of Personnel Management